Zirak may refer to:
 Zirak, Bushehr, Bushehr Province
 Zirak, Birjand, South Khorasan Province
 Zirak, Boshruyeh, South Khorasan Province